Nowosady may refer to the following places:
Nowosady, Gmina Michałowo in Podlaskie Voivodeship (north-east Poland)
Nowosady, Gmina Zabłudów in Podlaskie Voivodeship (north-east Poland)
Nowosady, Bielsk County in Podlaskie Voivodeship (north-east Poland)
Nowosady, Hajnówka County in Podlaskie Voivodeship (north-east Poland)
Nowosady, Sejny County in Podlaskie Voivodeship (north-east Poland)
Nowosady, Warmian-Masurian Voivodeship (north Poland)